Farrington Township is one of sixteen townships in Jefferson County, Illinois, USA.  As of the 2010 census, its population was 567 and it contained 246 housing units.

Geography
The township is centered at 38°26'N 88°45′W (38.429,-88.757).

Unincorporated towns
 Harmony at 
 Shields at 
 Stratton at 
(This list is based on USGS data and may include former settlements.)

Extinct towns
 Pigeon at 
(These towns are listed as "historical" by the USGS.)

Adjacent townships
 Romine Township, Marion County (north)
 Orchard Township, Wayne County (northeast)
 Hickory Hill Township, Wayne County (east)
 Webber Township (south)
 Mount Vernon Township (southwest)
 Field Township (west)
 Haines Township, Marion County (northwest)

Cemeteries
The township contains these eight cemeteries: Falley, Greenwalt, Harmony, Lowery, McConnaughhay, Mifflin, Mount Zion and Wells Chapel.

Demographics

School districts
 Farrington Grade School

Political districts
 Illinois' 19th congressional district
 State House District 107
 State Senate District 54

References
 
 United States Census Bureau 2007 TIGER/Line Shapefiles
 United States National Atlas

External links
 City-Data.com
 Illinois State Archives

Townships in Jefferson County, Illinois
Mount Vernon, Illinois micropolitan area
Townships in Illinois